Nunzio Brandi (born 10 May 2001) is an Italian professional footballer who plays as a midfielder for  club Taranto.

Club career
Born in Naples, Brandi was formed in Hellas Verona youth sector. He was promoted to the first team in the 2020–21 season.

On 1 September 2020, he was loaned to Serie C club Turris. Brandi made his professional debut on 4 October 2020 against Virtus Francavilla.

The next season, on 20 August 2021 he was loaned to Lucchese.

References

External links
 
 

2001 births
Living people
Footballers from Naples
Italian footballers
Association football midfielders
Serie C players
Hellas Verona F.C. players
S.S. Turris Calcio players
Lucchese 1905 players
Taranto F.C. 1927 players